Mīrzā Muḥammad Iʿtiṣām ad-Dīn Panchnūrī  or Itesham Uddin, was a Bengali diplomat for the Mughal Empire and the first educated South Asian to travel to Europe, in 1765. He was also a munshi serving the Nawabs of Bengal as well as the British East India Company. He had also written the text of the 1765 Treaty of Allahabad.

Early life and ancestry

Sayyid Muhammad I'tisam-ud-Din was born in 1730, to Sheikh Sayyid Taj-ud-Din, at the local Kazipara Masjid near his village. He belonged to a Bengali Muslim family of Sheikhs from the village of Panchnur; near the town of Chakdaha within Nadia district in the Mughal Empire's Bengal Subah The contemporary Bengali historian Shabnam Begum equates his grandfather, Sheikh Sayyid Shahab-ud-Din, to Shihabuddin Talish, author of the Fathiya-i 'Ibriya, an account of Mir Jumla's invasion of Assam.

His birthplace, Kazipara Masjid, still stands today and his forefathers were said to have arrived to Panchnur following the Battle of Pandua. His ancestors settled in Bengal after fleeing the Mongol invasion of Persia.

Education
I'tisam-ud-Din came from a privileged background, in which he was well educated and fluent in the Arabic, Bengali, Hindustani and Persian languages. His elder brother was a mufti and adviser to the Nawab of Bengal, Alivardi Khan. Munshi Salimullah and Mirza Muhammad Qasim, who worked under Mir Jafar, trained I'tisam to also become a munshi and taught him the Persian language.

Career
He began his career as a munshi to Mir Jafar in Murshidabad. On the accession of Mir Qasim, he entered the service of the British East India Company's Major Martin Yorke and Major Mark and took part in a campaign against Raja Asad uz-Zaman Khan of Birbhum. After the battle, Emperor Shah Alam II recognised his efforts during a visit to Azimabad.

Later, I'tisam served under Captain Mackinon as paymaster for an orphanage. He fought alongside Mackinon and the Company against Mir Qasim in 1763 during the Battle of Giria and the Battle of Udhwa Nala. Bardette also made I'tisam the Tehsildar of Kutubpur.

Travel to Europe
In 1765, he entered the service of John Carnac and had another audience with the Emperor Shah Alam at Jahazgarh. He assisted Colonel Carnac in a battle from Faizabad to Shora-Shapur. Following the battle, Shah Alam II offered I'tisam the title of Mirza if he was willing to work under him as a Munshi as well as the opportunity to travel to Europe. In Murshidabad, he set off with Captain Archibald Swinton on a diplomatic mission to the court of King George III to send a letter from Shah Alam II and 1 lakh takas. I'tisam was also accompanied by his servant, Muhammad Muqim. After three weeks at sea, Swinton revealed to I'tisam that neither the letter from Shah Alam nor his tribute of a lakh of takas was on board as it had been seized by Robert Clive. I'tisam taught Swinton the Arabic tales of Kalila and Demna. Robert Clive later on sent the money to the English king, on his own behalf to suppress contact between England and the Mughals. As such I'tisam never ended up meeting George III and instead accompanied Swinton to Nantes in France via the southern coast of Africa. He also visited Mauritius, Madagascar, the Cape of Good Hope and Ascension Island. In Nantes, Swinton left for England while I'tisam remained in France for a month travelling to Calais as well.

From Calais, I'tisam took a ship to Dover, reaching Britain in 1766. He remained in London for three months before reuniting with Swinton in Oxford, where they assisted Sir William Jones with South Asian manuscripts, the translation of the Persian book Farhang-i-Jahangiri into English and Jones' book, A grammar of the Persian language. During his time, he also taught Persian to those who intended to work in the Mughal Empire.

Return to Asia
He returned to Bengal after a three-year absence due to food problems. He was later employed by the British East India Company in negotiations with the Maratha Empire. He travelled with John Hamilton to Pune and drew up treaties and settled peace. Locals gave Itesamuddin the nickname of Bilayet Munshi due to him being the first to travel to what was known as the Vilayet.

In 1785, he published the Shigurf-nama-i-Wilayat (or 'Wonder Book of England'), in the Persian language, detailing his travels. He was the first educated South Asian to visit England and describe the journey. The work has been translated into English, Hindustani and Bengali.

Written works
Treaty of Allahabad
Shigurf Namah i Vilayat (Excellent intelligence concerning Europe)
"The wonders of Vilayet : being the memoir, originally in Persian, of a visit to France and Britain by Mirza Sheikh Iʼtesamuddin, an eighteenth century Indian gentleman"
"Shigurf namah i velaët, or, Excellent intelligence concerning Europe : being the travels of Mirza Itesa Modeen, in Great Britain and France"
Nasab Namah (Family tree of Itisam Uddin)

Death
It is estimated that he died in 1800.

See also
 Aftab Ali
 Ayub Ali Master
 British Bangladeshi
 Shah Abdul Majid Qureshi

Notes

References

18th-century Bengalis
People from British India
Mughal Empire people
18th-century Indian writers
1730 births
1800 deaths
18th-century Indian Muslims
British Indian history
Indian travel writers
People from Nadia district